Ssumier S Pasricha is an Indian actor, singer and businessman. He has starred in Indian movies, TV soaps and theater musicals. He is popularly known for his character 'Pammi Aunty' and has created viral videos with the same. Ssumier has won various awards world wide including the Bharat Shiromani Award for this acting.

Early life
Ssumier comes from a Punjabi family in Delhi. He received 5 years of training in Indian classical dance (Kuchipudi) from famous dance gurus, Raja and Radha Reddy and 13 years of training in Indian classical music. He went to Australia for higher studies where he worked as a Radio Jockey at a local radio station and became an active member of Indian Society of Western Australia. Ssumier declined the offer to join his family business to pursue his childhood dream of becoming an actor. He moved to Mumbai to take up acting as his full-time career. However, post his father's demise, Ssumier took up a new role of a businessman and joined his family business of Pharmaceuticals with a new aim of taking it to newer heights.

Career
Ssumier has worked across different mediums and has tasted success in the industry over the years. He also portrayed the role of "Shailu" in the TV soap, Sasural Simar Ka, and played the transgender protagonist Manabi Bandyopadhyay (who became a principal of a college) in TV show Code Red. His international projects include theatre musicals like 'Jesus Christ Super Star and Heart to Heart'. He has worked with director, Shekhar Kapur, in the musical 'Mahim Junction'. He has starred alongside actor Abhishek Bacchan in a TV commercial for the mobile network operator Idea Cellular. Ssumier also features on comedy TV show Comedy Nights Bachao.

Pammi Aunty
Ssumier has gained popularity for creating viral videos based on a fictional character 'Pammi Aunty'-- impersonation of a typical middle-class Delhi Punjabi woman who loves to gossip, crib and complain about many things to her friends over the phone. Ssumier came up with the idea of creating 'Pammi Aunty' while experimenting with filters in the video social media app, Snapchat. Celebrities such as veteran actor, Rishi Kapoor, and British-Indian director Gurinder Chadha, have publicly appreciated the 'Pammi Aunty' videos.

Filmography

Television and Digital (Shows and Campaigns)

Film

Theatre

TV commercials

Music
{| class="wikitable" style="font-size: 90%;"
! Year !! Song !! Label !! Genre
|-
| 2020 || Teri jyota to balihari || T series || Devotional 
|-
| 2021 || Jai Kali Jai Mahakali || Shreeng Entertainment || Devotional
|}

Photography
Ssumier is also a professional photographer. He has done photoshoots for magazines such as National Geographic. His photos have been carried by other international magazines in Spain, Australia and New Zealand.

Association with Jordan Tourism
Jordan Tourism has collaborated with Ssumier to drive more Indian tourists to the country. Ssumier has been asked to make promotional videos starring Pammi Aunty to showcase the tourist attractions in Jordan.

Association with social causes
Ssumier has been associated with the educational online platform Agents of Ishq'', which provides educational material about sex, sexuality, and gender. He made a 'Pammi Aunty' video to de-stigmatize homosexuality in India.

He has also supported AIDS awareness initiatives such as Red Ribbon campaign in India.

In a video appeal, he urged Prime Minister of India, Narendra Modi, to take action for crimes against women in Delhi

Awards

References

External links
 

1980 births
Living people
Indian male comedians
21st-century Indian photographers
Male actors from Delhi
Indian male television actors
Male actors in Hindi television
21st-century Indian male actors